Spin pumping is a method of generating a spin current, the spintronic analog of a battery in conventional electronics.

In order to make a spintronic device, the primary requirement is to have a system that:
 can generate a current of spin-polarized electrons and
 is sensitive to the spin polarization.  

Most spintronic devices also have a unit in between these two that changes the current of electrons depending on the spin states. Candidates for such devices include injection schemes based on magnetic semiconductors and ferromagnetic metals, ferromagnetic resonance devices
, and a variety of spin-dependent pumps.  Optical, microwave and electrical methods are also being explored. These devices could be used for low-power data transmission in spintronic devices
or to transmit electrical signals through insulators.

Tunneling
Spin tunneling transport at the interface between a normal metal and a ferromagnetic insulator can be driven by microwave irradiation on the ferromagnetic side.

Magnetic Moment
The spin pumped into an adjacent layer by a precessing magnetic moment is given by

References

See also
Spintronic
Spin wave
Spin Engineering
Spin Hall effect
Spin memory loss

Spintronics